Dharmasoka was an infant King of Polonnaruwa in the thirteenth century, who ruled from 1208 to 1209. He was three months old and installed as king by General Ayasmantha succeeding Kalyanavati as king of Polonnaruwa and was succeeded by his father Anikanga.

See also
 List of Sri Lankan monarchs
 History of Sri Lanka

References

External links
 Kings & Rulers of Sri Lanka
 Codrington's Short History of Ceylon

Monarchs of Polonnaruwa
D
D
D
Monarchs who died as children
Child monarchs from Asia
Monarchs deposed as children